Tiruchchirappalli Junction railway station, also known as Trichy Junction railway station (station code: TPJ) is a junction station in Tiruchirappalli, Tamil Nadu. It serves as the headquarters for Tiruchirappalli railway division of the Southern Railway zone. The station code is TPJ, used for official purposes. Daily approximately 15,000 passengers are using this Tiruchirappalli Junction. TPJ is the only railway station in southern railway to host diesel–electric multiple unit (DEMU) shed. Tiruchirappalli Junction is the second largest railway station in Tamil Nadu and one of the busiest railway stations in India. The Station was awarded with ‘GOLD’ (72 Points) rating in March 2020 by the Confederation of Indian Industries (CII) for implementing various environment-friendly measures. It is the first and only station in Southern Railway to get "GOLD" certification and 5th across Indian Railways.

History

The Great Southern of India, a railway company was established in 1853 with Tiruchirappalli as its headquarters. In 1859, the company constructed its first railway line that connected Tiruchirappalli with Nagapattinam. Presently, Tiruchirappalli is an important railway junction in Tamil Nadu and is a separate division of the Southern Railway.

Five rail lines branch separately from Trichy Junction:

 Towards north for  via 
 Towards east for  via 
 Towards south-east for 
 Towards south for  via 
 Towards west for  via

Credits and developments
It has been awarded 5 stars for electricity conservation. Golden Rock Railway Workshop and Diesel Loco Shed were involved in maintaining the bogies and locomotives respectively for passenger and freight operations. The station is also equipped with free Wi-Fi, retiring rooms, and AC lounge for passengers at 1st platform. The construction of new platform no.8 is on fastrack to reduce the waiting of trains. There is Frequent Passenger Trains towards Karur, Erode, Thanjavur, Karaikudi, Virudhachalam and Dindigul.

Urban stations 
  (TPE)
  (TP)
  (GOC)
 Manjattidal (MCJ)
 Tiruverumbur (TRB)
  (TPTN)
  (SRGM)
Pichchandarkovil (BXS)
Uthamar kovil (UKV)

Suburban stations 
 Kumaramangalam (KRMG)
 Tondamanpatti (TOM)
 Mutharasanallur (MTNL)
 Mekkudi (MKY)
 Jiyapuram (JPM)
 Elamanur (EL)
 Perugamani (PGN)
 Pullambadi (PMB)
 Valadi (VLDI)
 Lalgudi (LLI)
 Punggudi (PUG)
 Kolatur (KLS)
Pettaivaithalai (PNI)

In popular culture
Tiruchchirappalli Junction is one of the most prominent landmarks in the city so has often featured in movies. The station has been used in some Indian novels and art productions over the years. Films and other programs filmed at the station, include:
 Vaaranam Aayiram (2008) (Tamil)
 Siva Manasula Sakthi (Tamil)
 Kalaga Thalaivan

See also
 List of railway stations in India
Railway Heritage Centre, Tiruchirappalli

References

External links 

 Trichy Junction Train Timings
 
 

kkjhh

Railway junction stations in Tamil Nadu
Railway stations in Tiruchirappalli
Railway stations in India opened in 1859